Zebica may refer to:

 Zebica (Kruševac), village in the municipality of Kruševac, Serbia
 Zebica (Kuršumlija), village in the municipality of Kuršumlija, Serbia